IDFC First Bank (formerly IDFC Bank) is an Indian private sector bank formed by the merger of the banking arm of Infrastructure Development Finance Company and Capital First, an Indian non-bank financial institution.

It is the first universal bank to offer monthly interest credit on savings accounts, lifetime free credit cards with dynamic and low annual percentage rates.

History 

IDFC Limited was set up in 1997 to finance infrastructure projects in India. It diversified into investment banking and institutional securities (2007), Mutual Funds (2008), Infrastructure Debt Fund (2015). In 2014, the Reserve Bank of India granted in-principle approval to IDFC Limited to set up a new bank in the private sector. Following this, the IDFC Limited divested its infrastructure finance assets and liabilities to a new entity - IDFC Bank. The bank was launched through this demerger from IDFC Limited and it was officially inaugurated by Prime Minister of India Narendra Modi in October 2015.

IDFC Bank started operations on 1 October 2015, with 23 branches in Madhya Pradesh, Delhi, Mumbai, Hyderabad, Bengaluru, Pune, Chennai, Ahmedabad and Kolkata. It has more than 600 branches across India till 2021. 15 branches are in settlements with a population of less than 10,000. IDFC Bank launched its 100th branch in Honnali, Karnataka, in October 2017.

In January 2018, IDFC Bank and non-banking financial company Capital First announced a merger. Capital First, then called Future Capital Holdings, went public on India's stock exchanges in 2008. Between 2008 and 2010, the company started a number of separate businesses through joint ventures. These included financing for real estate developers, corporate credit, private equity, asset management, retail brokerage, foreign exchange, mall management, wealth management, property services, and more.  In 2010, V Vaidyanathan, who was serving as MD and CEO of ICICI Prudential Life Insurance at the time, came to an arrangement to purchase ten percent of the company's shares.

Merger 
The Reserve Bank has approved the appointment of V. Vaidyanathan as Managing Director and CEO of IDFC First Bank for a period of three years effective from December 19, 2018.

The loan assets and borrowings of IDFC Limited were transferred to IDFC Bank at the time of inception. 13.9 shares of IDFC Bank were issued for every share of Capital First as part of the merger scheme.

The parent entity, IDFC Limited, retained the AMC, Institutional Broking and Infrastructure Debt Fund business through IDFC Financial Holding Company Limited (NOFHC).

Shareholding 
As of December 2022, the promoter holding at the bank is 36.38%; the institutional holding is at 33.60%, the public holding is at 30.01%. But on 22 February 2023, IDFC Limited announced it intention to invest INR 2,200 crores in the bank. This will bring IDFC Limited's current holding in the bank up to 40 percent, from the current level of 36.38 percent.

Also, on 22 February 2023, the bank issued 12,03,745 equity shares to its employees under the company ESOP plan.

Operations 
The bank begin to grow its loans with a particular focus on retail as it comes out of nearly four-year self-imposed restrictions on growth while building the deposit franchise. As of 22 October 2022, IDFC First Bank reports a 266 per cent jump in its net profit at ₹556 crore for the quarter ended September 2022. Its core operating income (excluding trading gains) rose by 35 per cent from a year ago to ₹3,947 crore in Q2 of 2022-23 fiscal year. Net interest income climbed 32 per cent at ₹3,002 crore, while fee and other income spurted by 44 per cent to ₹945 crore in the September quarter of FY23.

IDFC FIRST Bank reached a ROA of 1% within three and half years, with gross NPA of 2% and net NPA of only 0.7% as on quarter ending September 2022. The transformation of the bank into a retail bank is complete.

As of November 2022, the bank has expanded to 670 branches, 249 asset service centres, 812 ATMs and 606 rural business correspondent centres across the country.

Products and services 
Bank provides products and services related to retail banking, wholesale banking and investment banking. But, among other products, home loans continue to be the biggest growth drivers for the bank. The company also offers one of the highest interest rate for saving accounts in the country, with an interest rate of 6%.

Milestones 

 2003 - The company raised $200 million for the India Development Fund, the first infrastructure-focused private equity fund.
 2009 - IDFC signs UNGC Global Compact.
 2010 - Infrastructure Development Finance Corporation (IDFC) has raised ₹2,654 crore by a qualified institutional placement (QIP), attracting demand for twice the shares on offer, according to an advisor to the sale.
 2013 - IDFC becomes first Indian institution to adopt Equator principles.
 2014 - RBI grants banking license to IDFC Bank.
 2017 - The bank IDFC Bank is the first in India to launch Aadhaar-linked cashless merchant solution.
 2018 - IDFC Bank merged with Capital First to create IDFC First Bank.
 2020 - The bank announced that it has signed Amitabh Bachchan, as its first brand ambassador.
 2021 - It announced the entry into credit card sector with low interest rates and interest free credit in 2021.

Mergers and acquisitions 
The bank, IDFC Financial Holdings, and IDFC all came together to form IDFC in 2021, marking the beginning of the process of a reverse merger. The promoter group comprises both of these organisations as members.

Philanthropy 
Under bank’s employee funded Ghar Ghar Ration program, the bank employees will supply ration kits to 50,000 low income customers whose livelihood has been impacted by the pandemic. As many as 16,000 benefits have reached across Rajasthan, Madhya Pradesh, Maharashtra, Odisha, Gujarat, Karnataka, Haryana, Tamil Nadu, Andhra Pradesh and Chhattisgarh under this program. The lender has also identified 250 vulnerable families who have lost an earning member of their family to COVID-19 with a cash relief support of ₹10,000 in a partnership with 'Give India'.

See also 

 Banking in India
 List of banks in India
 Reserve Bank of India
 Indian Financial System Code
 List of largest banks
 List of companies of India
 Make in India

References 

2015 establishments in Maharashtra
Banks based in Mumbai
IDFC First Bank
Warburg Pincus companies
Indian companies established in 2015
Banks established in 2015
Companies listed on the National Stock Exchange of India
Companies listed on the Bombay Stock Exchange